Katalin Hartai (born 24 March 1963 in Budapest) is a retired female javelin thrower from Hungary who represented her native country during the 1980s and the early 1990s.

Achievements

Awards
 Hungarian athlete of the Year (1): 1990

References

1963 births
Living people
Hungarian female javelin throwers
Athletes from Budapest